The Aremberg is, at , the highest mountain in the Ahr Hills or Ahr Eifel (Ahreifel). It lies in the district of Ahrweiler, Rhineland-Palatinate (Germany).

Geographic location 
On its southwestern slopes lies the village of Aremberg and, at its southeastern foot, the village of Antweiler. The basalt cone is surrounded by the small nature reserve of Aremberg.

A section of the middle reaches of the River Ahr flows past the Aremberg to the east; to the north an Ahr tributary, the Eichenbach, flows around the mountain.

Aremberg Castle 
On the summit are a few ruins belonging to Aremberg Castle, once a mighty fortress, below and north of the mountaintop runs a section of Roman road.

Nürburgring Nordschleife 
A section of the Nürburgring-Nordschleife racing track, from which the Aremberg can be seen, is named after the mountain.

References

External links 

Mountains and hills of Rhineland-Palatinate
Mountains and hills of the Eifel
Mountains under 1000 metres
Volcanoes of Germany